Melvin Belton Embree (January 6, 1927 – August 30, 1996) was a gridiron football end who played in the National Football League and the Canadian Football League. He played college football at Pepperdine.

College career
Embree played football and ran track at Los Angeles City College for one year before transferring to Pepperdine University. Embree was named All-California Collegiate Athletic Association as a senior in 1950.

Professional career
After graduating from Pepperdine, Embree was signed by the Calgary Stampeders of the Canadian Football League (CFL), playing in one game before being released. He was signed by the Winnipeg Blue Bombers, but missed some games due to a contract dispute and finished the season with 16 receptions for 423 yards and seven touchdowns, including five in his first four games. Embree was signed by the newly-formed Baltimore Colts at the end of the season and was a member of the team's inaugural roster. He was waived by the Colts the following season and was claimed by the Chicago Cardinals.

References

1927 births
1996 deaths
Players of American football from Los Angeles
American football ends
Pepperdine Waves football players
Baltimore Colts players
Winnipeg Blue Bombers players
Los Angeles City Cubs football players
Chicago Cardinals players